Keres, also Keresan, is a Native American language, spoken by the Keres Pueblo people in New Mexico. Depending on the analysis, Keres is considered a small language family or a language isolate with several dialects. The varieties of each of the seven Keres pueblos are mutually intelligible with its closest neighbors. There are significant differences between the Western and Eastern groups, which are sometimes counted as separate languages.

Family division
In 2007, there was an estimate total of 10,670 speakers.

 Eastern Keres: total of 4,580 speakers (1990 census)
 Cochiti Pueblo Kotyit dialect: 600 speakers (2007)
 San Felipe Pueblo Katishtya dialect: 2,340 speakers (2007)
Kewa Pueblo (formally Santo Domingo Pueblo) Kewa dialect: 2,850 speakers (2007)
 Zia Pueblo Ts'ia dialect: 500 speakers (2007)
 Santa Ana Pueblo Tamaiya dialect: 390 speakers (2007)
 Western Keres: total of 3,391 speakers (1990 census)
 Acoma Pueblo  Áakʼu dialect: 1,930 speakers (2007)
 Laguna Pueblo Kawaika dialect: 2,060 speakers (2007)

Genetic relationships

Keres is now considered a language isolate. In the past, Edward Sapir grouped it together with a Hokan–Siouan stock. Morris Swadesh suggested a connection with Wichita. Joseph Greenberg grouped Keres with Siouan, Yuchi, Caddoan, and Iroquoian in a superstock called Keresiouan. None of these proposals has been validated by subsequent linguistic research.

Phonology
Keresan has between 42 and 45 consonant sounds, and around 40 vowel sounds, adding up to a total of about 85 phonemes, depending on the analysis and the language variety. Based on the classification in the World Atlas of Language Structures, Keres is a language with a large consonant inventory.

The great number of consonants relates to the three-way distinction between voiceless, aspirated and ejective consonants (e.g. /t tʰ tʼ/), and to the larger than average number of fricatives (i.e. /s sʼ ʂ ʂʼ ʃ ʃʼ h/) and affricates, the latter also showing the three-way distinction found in stops.

The large number of vowels derives from a distinction made between long and short vowels (e.g. /e eː/), as well as from the presence of tones and voicelessness. Thus, a single vowel quality may occur with seven distinct realizations: /é è e̥ éː èː êː ěː/, all of which are used to distinguish words in the language.

Consonants
The chart below contains the consonants of the proto-Keresan (or pre-Keresan) from Miller & Davis (1963) based on a comparison of Acoma, Santa Ana, and Santo Domingo, as well as other features of the dialects compiled from The Language of Santa Ana Pueblo (1964), Kansas Working Papers in Linguistics (1987), and The Phonemes of Keresan (1946), and the Grammar of Laguna Keres (2005).

{| class="wikitable IPA" style="text-align: center;"
|- style="line-height: 1.1em;"
!colspan="2" | 
!Labial
!Alveolar
!Palatal
!Retroflex
!Velar
!Glottal
|-
! rowspan="2" |Nasal
!voiced
|
|
|
|
|
|
|-
!glottalized
|
|
|
|
|
|
|-
! rowspan="3" | Plosive
!voiceless
| ||  ||  || ||  || 
|-
!aspirated
| ||  ||  || || 
|
|-
!ejective
| ||  || 
| || 
|
|-
! rowspan="3" |Affricate
!voiceless
|
|
|
|
|
|
|-
!aspirated
|
|
|
|
|
|
|-
!ejective
|
|
|
|
|
|
|-
!rowspan="2" | Fricative
!voiceless
| ||  ||  ||  || 
|
|-
!ejective
| ||  ||  ||  || 
|
|-
!rowspan="2" | Approximant
!voiced
| ||  ||  ||
| 
|
|-
!glottalized
| ||  ||  ||
|
|
|}

Vowels
Keresan vowels have a phonemic distinction in duration: all vowels can be long or short. Additionally, short vowels can also be voiceless. The vowel chart below contains the vowel phonemes and allophones from the information of the Keresan languages combined from The Language of Santa Ana Pueblo (1964), The Phonemes of Keresan (1946), and Kansas Working Papers in Linguistics (1987).

Notes:
 Western Keres does not have phonemic /oː/ or /o/, though both vowels may occur phonetically. Eastern Keres words containing /o/ show /au/ in Western Keres. For instance, the first vowel in the word-sentence Sraúka̠cha̠ – “I see you”:
 Kotyit Keres: [ʂóːkʰɑ̥tʃʰɑ̥]
 Kʼawaika Keres: [ʂɑ̌ukʰɑ̥tʃʰɑ̥]

Voiceless vowels 
All Keresan short vowels may be devoiced in certain positions. The phonemic status of these vowels is controversial. Maring (1967) considers them to be phonemes of Áákʼu Keres, whereas other authors disagree. There are phonetic grounds for vowel devoicing based on the environment they occur, for instance word-finally, but there are also exceptions. Vowels in final position are nearly always voiceless and medial vowels occurring between voiced consonants, after nasals and ejectives are nearly always voiced.
 Word-final devoicing: [pɑ̌ːkʊ̥] because
 Word-medial devoicing: [ʔìpʰi̥ʃɑ́] white paint

Tones
Acoma Keres has four lexical tones: high, low, falling and rising. Falling and rising tones only occur in long vowels and voiceless vowels bear no tones:

Syllable structure

Most Keresan syllables take a CV(V) shape. The maximal syllable structure is CCVVC and the minimal syllable is CV. In native Keresan words, only a glottal stop /ʔ/ ⟨ʼ⟩ can close a syllable, but some loanwords from Spanish have syllables that end in a consonant, mostly a nasal (i.e. /m n/ but words containing these sequences are rare in the language.

Due to extensive vowel devoicing, several Keresan words may be perceived as ending in consonants or even containing consonant clusters.
 Word-internal cluster: yʼâakạ srûunị ‘stomach’ /jˀɑ̂ːkḁʂûːni/ > [jɑ̂ːkḁʂûːni] ~ [jɑ̂ːkʂûːni]
 Word-final coda: úwàakạ ‘baby’; /úwɑ̀ːkḁ/ > [úwɑ̀ːkʰḁ] ~ [úwɑ̀ːkʰ]

Phonotactics 
The only sequence of consonants (i.e. consonant cluster) that occurs in native Keresan words is a sequence of a fricative /ʃ ʂ/ and a stop or affricate. Clusters are restricted to beginnings of syllables (i.e. the syllable onset). When the alveolo-palatal consonant /ʃ/ occurs as C1, it combines with alveolar and palatal C2, whereas the retroflex alveolar /ʂ/ precedes bilabial and velar C2s, which suggest a complementary distribution. Consonant clusters may occur both word-initially and word-medially.

Orthography 
Traditional Keresan beliefs postulate that Keres is a sacred language that must exist only in its spoken form. The language's religious connotation and years of persecution of Pueblo religion by European colonizers may also explain why no unified orthographic convention exists for Keresan. However, a practical spelling system has been developed for Laguna (Kʼawaika) and more recently for Acoma (Áakʼu) Keres, both of which are remarkably consistent.

In the Keres spelling system, each symbol represents a single phoneme. The letters ⟨c q z f⟩ and sometimes also ⟨v⟩ are not used. Digraphs represent both palatal consonants (written using a sequence of C and ⟨y⟩), and retroflex consonants, which are represented using a sequence of C and the letter ⟨r⟩. These graphemes used for writing Western Keres are shown between ⟨...⟩ below.

Consonant symbols

Signage at Acoma Pueblo 
Signs at Acoma Pueblo sometimes use special diacritics for ejective consonants that differ from the symbols above, as shown in the table:

Vowel symbols 
Vowel sounds are represented straightforwardly in the existing spellings for Keresan. Each vowel sound is written using a unique letter or digraph (for long vowels and diphthongs). However, there are two competing representations for the vowel /ɨ/. Some versions simply use the IPA ⟨ɨ⟩ whereas others use the letter ⟨v⟩ (the sound /v/ as in veal does not occur in Keresan). Voiceless vowels have also been represented in two ways; either underlined or with a dot below (see table).

Diacritics for tone 
Tone may or may not be represented in the orthography of Keresan. When represented, four diacritics may be used above the vowel. Unlike the system used for Navajo, diacritics for tone are not repeated in long vowels.

Keres alphabet and alphabetical order 
Although Keresan is not normally written, there exists only one dictionary of the language in which words are listed in any given order. In this dictionary of Western Keres, digraphs count as single letters, although ejective consonants are not listed separately; occurring after their non-ejective counterparts. The glottal stop ⟨ʼ⟩  and long vowels (e.g. ⟨aa ee ii⟩ etc.) are not treated as separate letters.

Sample texts

Orthography marking tone 
Woodpecker and Coyote

⟨Ái dítʼîishu srbígà kʼánâaya dyáʼâʼu. Shʼée srbígà ái dyěitsị ái náyáa shdyɨ dyáʼa.⟩
/ ɑ́ì títʼîːʃù ʂpíkɑ̀ kʼɑ́nɑ̂ːjɑ̀ cɑ́ʔɑ̂ʔù | ʃʼéː ʂpíkɑ̀ ɑ́ì cěǐtsʰi̥ ɑ́ì nɑ́jɑ́ː ʃcɨ̀ cɑ́ʔɑ̀ /

Orthography without tone marking 
Boas text

Baanaʼa, egu kauʼseeʼe, atsi sʼaama-ee srayutse.

Morphosyntax 
Keresan is a split-ergative language in which verbs denoting states (i.e. stative verbs) behave differently from those indexing actions, especially in terms of the person affixes they take. This system of argument marking is based on a split-intransitive pattern, in which subjects are marked differently if they are perceived as actors than from when they are perceived as undergoers of the action being described.

The morphology of Keresan is mostly prefixing, although suffixes and reduplication also occur. Keresan distinguishes nouns, verbs, numerals and particles as word classes. Nouns in Keresan do not normally distinguish case or number, but they can be inflected for possession, with distinct constructions for alienable and inalienable possession. Other than possession, Keresan nouns show no comprehensive noun classes.

Word order 
Keresan is a verb-final language, though word order is rather flexible.

Laguna Keres:

Negation 
Negation is doubly marked in Keresan. In addition to the adverb dzaadi, verbs index negation through a suffix (e.g. -u).
 Gukacha 'S/he saw her/him'
 Dzaadi gukachau 'S/he didn't see her/him'

Verbal morphology 
The verb is a central grammatical category in Keres, conveying the most information about events in communicative acts. Through its morphemes, Keresan verbs code not only person and number of the initiator of the action (e.g. “Tammy drinks decaf”) as is common in Indo-European languages, but also how the initiator is implicated in the action. For instance, the three verbs that describe Tammy's actions in “Tammy kicked the ball” vs. “Tammy jumped” vs. “Tammy sneezed” require different levels of effort from Tammy, that is when kicking vs. jumping vs. sneezing.

Additionally, the person and number of the undergoer of the action are all coded on the verb (e.g. the word gukacha means “S/he sees her/him”, a full sentence in English). The ways the speaker assesses the action (i.e. evidentiality, as in “I think Tammy arrived from class” vs. “Tammy arrived from class”). Finally, the internal temporal structure of the action (i.e. aspect, as in “Tammy was sneezing in class” vs. “Tammy sneezed in class”) is also coded in Keresan verbs.

According to Maring (1967), the Keresan verb is organized around the following grammatical categories (pp. 39–40)

 Subject/Object relations
 Subject of intransitive verbs: marked by a prefix that distinguishes 3-4 persons in the singular (see below).
 Subject of transitive verbs: marked by a prefix that distinguishes 3-4 persons in the singular (see below).
 Object of transitive verbs: marked by a prefix that combines with the subject prefix, or by a suffix
 Number relations
 Singular: usually marked by a prefix
 Dual: can be marked by a prefix, partial reduplication or by suffixes
 Plural: can be marked by a prefix, partial reduplication, by suffixes or by suppletive stem forms (i.e. singular and plural forms are not related etymologically)
 Temporal relations
 Future: is marked on the verb by a series of prefixes that also encode number
 Modality relations
 Indicative
 Dubitative
 Hortative
 Negative hortative
 Negative
 Future negative
 Voice relations
 Active
 Passive
 Reflexive
 Reciprocal
 Aspect
 Imperfective
 Inceptive
 Repetitive
 Continuative
 Habitual
 Inchoative
 Perfective

The verbal prefix 
In Keres, the verbal prefix carries information from five different grammatical categories: argument role, modality, polarity, person and number. That is, a single Keresan verb prefix codes who initiated the action and how implicated that entity is (the subject/case), whom underwent the effects of the action (the direct object), the speaker's assessment of the action (the modality) and whether it occurred or not (polarity). On the other hand, information about when the action took place (i.e. tense) is expressed elsewhere in a clause, mostly by adverbs.

Number 
Keresan verbs distinguish three numbers: singular, dual (two entities) and plural (more than two entities);  and four persons: first (the speaker), second (the hearer), third (a known, definite or salient entity being talked about) and fourth (a non-salient, unknown or indefinite entity being talked about, also known as obviative) persons. The plural and dual forms are often marked by reduplication of part of the stem (gukacha ‘s/he saw it’ vs guʼukacha ‘the two of them saw it’).

Argument role 
Languages encode two main types of actions: those in which the main participant initiates an action that produces change in an object (e.g. kick a ball, buy a gift, cook a dish, read a book);  and those in which the action produces no (perceived) change in the world or that have no object (sneezing, breathing, growing, diving, etc.).  Actions that take an object are encoded by transitive verbs, whereas those that take no object are expressed via intransitive verbs.

Intransitive verbs 
In Indo-European languages like English, all intransitive verbs behave similarly (‘They sneeze/breathe/dive/think’/etc.). In Keresan, actions that take no object are conceptualized in two distinct ways depending on how the initiator of the action is implicated. More active-like intransitive verbs (e.g. ‘to sneeze’) are coded through one set of morphemes, whereas actions conceptualized as involving the initiator at a lesser degree (e.g. ‘to believe’) are coded using a separate set of prefixes.

Ideas expressed in Indo-European languages with adjectives are most often encoded by verbs in Keresan. That is, in Keresan one express the idea in the sentence ‘He is selfish’ by saying something along the lines of ‘He selfishes’. In such “actions”, the entity that is characterized by them is not implicated in the action directly (i.e. it's beyond their control), and thus belong in the Inactive intransitive category. The different sets of prefixes are shown below:

Transitive verbs

Aspect 
Aspect in Keresan is signalled by suffixes.

Time (tense) adverbials 
The category of tense is expressed in Keresan via adverbs that indicate when the action about which one is speaking took place.

Lexicon 
New words are coined through a number of roots that are combined to pre-existing ones. Compounding is a common strategy for word building, although derivation also occurs.

Numerals 
The Keresan numeral system is a base 10 system. Numerals 11–19, as well as those between the multiple of tens, are formed by adding the word kʼátsi (/ kʼátsʰɪ /  'ten') followed by the word dzidra (/tsɪtʂa/ 'more'). Numerals 20 and above are formed by adding a multiplicative adverb (-wa or -ya) to the base number and the word kʼátsi.

Loanwords from Spanish 
European colonizers arriving in the Southwest US brought with them material culture and concepts that were unknown to the peoples living in the area. Words for the new ideas introduced by Spaniards were often borrowed into Keres directly from Early Modern Spanish, and a large number of these persists in Modern Keresan.

Proto-language

Selected Proto-Keresan reconstructions of plants, animals, and toponyms by Miller and Davis (1963):

{| class="wikitable sortable"
! no. !! gloss !! Proto-Keresan
|-
| 10 || wheat || *ʔáṣánɪ
|-
| 17 || centipede || *ʔíʔìˑdʸawa
|-
| 19 || cholla cactus || *ʔiˑbánɪ
|-
| 27 || porcupine || *ʔiˑṣ̍á
|-
| 45 || toad || *bêˑrak̠ᴀ
|-
| 63 || turkey || *cinᴀ
|-
| 64 || fox || *cúsk̠ɪ
|-
| 71 || locust || *c̍íˑga
|-
| 72 || Zia Pueblo || *c̍íˑy̍á
|-
| 78 || kiva || *c̆ídʸá
|-
| 83 || medicine man || *č̇áyâˑni
|-
| 84 || hawk || *č̇ɨ́ˑríga
|-
| 85 || horned toad || *dabínᴜsk̠ᴀ
|-
| 87 || Santa Ana Pueblo || *dámáyá
|-
| 88 || squash || *dâˑni
|-
| 91 || corn husk || *díˑskámí
|-
| 93 || dog || *díyᴀ
|-
| 98 || bobcat || *dʸáˑdʸᴜ
|-
| 101 || deer || *dʸán̍é
|-
| 104 || gourd || *dʸáˑwí
|-
| 105 || piñon pine || *dʸèic̠ɪ
|-
| 108 || elk || *dʸɨ́ˑṣᴀ
|-
| 110 || badger || *dʸúˑbí
|-
| 112 || beans || *gánami
|-
| 114 || seed || *gáwɪc̠ɪ
|-
| 119 || bear || *gúháyᴀ
|-
| 124 || yucca || *háʔásc̐á
|-
| 127 || oak || *ha̍ˑbánɪ
|-
| 137 || pine tree || *hâˑniˑ
|-
| 147 || Jemez Pueblo || *héˑmíšíˑ-cɪ, *héˑmíšíˑ-zé
|-
| 149 || turtle || *héyᴀdʸɪ
|-
| 157 || willow || *híẓᵻsk̍áwa
|-
| 158 || dove || *húˑʔùˑga
|-
| 161 || yucca fruit || *hùˑsk̍ani
|-
| 169 || antelope || *kɨ́ˑc̠ɪ
|-
| 175 || wolf || *k̍ákana
|-
| 176 || spider || *k̍ámᴀsk̠ᵻ
|-
| 198 || mountain lion || *mûˑk̍aiẓᴀ
|-
| 200 || buffalo || *múšêiẓᴀ
|-
| 201 || soapweed || *múšɪ
|-
| 213 || hummingbird || *m̍îˑzᴀ
|-
| 225 || prairie dog || *nɨ́t̠ɪ
|-
| 232 || bedbug || *peséc̍uru
|-
| 239 || salamander || *p̍águra
|-
| 241 || rabbit || *rèˑdʸᴀ
|-
| 246 || woodpecker || *sbíga
|-
| 247 || chicken || *sbíˑná
|-
| 251 || meadowlark || *sc̐áˑná
|-
| 254 || grasshopper || *sc̐ár̍ɪ
|-
| 260 || crow || *sc̐ɨ́r̍á
|-
| 262 || wild honey || *sc̐úmᵻ
|-
| 264 || mosquito || *sc̐úy̍úˑná
|-
| 274 || ant || *síˑʔí
|-
| 275 || squirrel || *síˑdʸᴀ
|-
| 279 || mouse || *síyan̍ᵻ
|-
| 282 || bighorn sheep || *skàˑsk̠ᴜ
|-
| 286 || bullsnake || *sk̍áʔáˑdʸᴜ
|-
| 287 || fish || *sk̍àˑšᵻ
|-
| 291 || peas || *sk̍úrúˑná
|-
| 293 || dwarf corn || *spíníní
|-
| 306 || parrot || *šâˑwit̠ᴀ
|-
| 307 || flea, louse || *šínaˑ
|-
| 309 || goose || *šúˑdá
|-
| 318 || blue jay || *ṣúisɪ
|-
| 319 || snake || *ṣûˑwiˑ
|-
| 342 || abalone shell || *w̍a̍ˑbɨ́nɪ
|-
| 347 || duck || *w̍âˑyuṣᴀ
|-
| 354 || corn silk || *yábášɪ
|-
| 355 || corn || *yáˑčínɪ
|-
| 356 || mesquite || *yêˑt̠ᴜ
|-
| 357 || worm || *yúʔúbɨ́
|-
| 369 || corn cob || *y̍úˑskúm̍á
|}

In popular media 
Keres was one of the seven languages sung in the Coca-Cola "It's Beautiful" commercial during the 2014 Super Bowl featuring "America the Beautiful".

See also
Keresan Sign Language

References

Bibliography

External links

 Nathan Romero, "Chochiti Keres: About Me and My Language: The politics of saving a vanishing language: The politics of writing", Language Documentation Training Center, University of Hawaii, Manoa (UHM)

Grammatical and Lexical Notes on the Keres Language (Acoma-Laguna Dialect) of the Keresan Stock
English-Queres Language Vocabulary
Keres Language Project – Keres Audio Dictionary

 
Indigenous languages of the North American Southwest
Indigenous languages of the Southwestern United States
Indigenous languages of New Mexico
Puebloan peoples
Acoma Pueblo
Laguna Pueblo
Language families
Pueblo linguistic area